This is a list of the governors of Córdoba. The Governor of the Argentine province of Córdoba is the highest executive officer of the province.

List

Official Government Site

See also
Legislature of Córdoba
Politics of Argentina

1820 establishments in South America